Master of the Staghounds was a position in the British Royal Household created in 1738 and abolished in 1782. The office was responsible for the oversight and care of the Royal staghounds (dogs bred for hunting deer). 

"Master of Staghounds" was also a title or descriptive given to staghound masters on a more local level.

Masters of the Staghounds
1738: Evelyn Pierrepont, 2nd Duke of Kingston-upon-Hull
1744: Lord Robert Manners-Sutton
1762: Vacant
1763: William Byron, 5th Baron Byron
1765: William Monckton-Arundell, 2nd Viscount Galway
1770: William Capell, 4th Earl of Essex

References

See also
Devon and Somerset Staghounds

Positions within the British Royal Household
Dog-related professions and professionals
1782 disestablishments in Great Britain